The 2003 Delray Beach International Tennis Championships was a men's tennis tournament played on outdoor hard courts at the Delray Beach Tennis Center in Delray Beach, Florida in the United States and was part of the International Series of the 2003 ATP Tour. It was the 11th edition of the tournament and was held from March 3 through March 9, 2003. Fourth-seeded Jan-Michael Gambill won the singles title.

Finals

Singles

 Jan-Michael Gambill defeated  Mardy Fish 6–0, 7–6(7–5)
 It was Gambill's 1st singles title of the year and the 3rd and last of his career.

Doubles

 Leander Paes /  Nenad Zimonjić defeated  Raemon Sluiter /  Martin Verkerk 7–5, 3–6, 7–5
 It was Paes's 2nd title of the year and the 28th of his career. It was Zimonjić's 1st title of the year and the 6th of his career.

References

External links
 Official website
 ATP tournament profile
 ITF tournament edition details

Delray Beach International Tennis Championships
Delray Beach Open
2003 Delray Beach International Tennis Championships
Delray Beach International Tennis Championships
Delray Beach International Tennis Championships
Delray Beach International Tennis Championships